= Payments Associations =

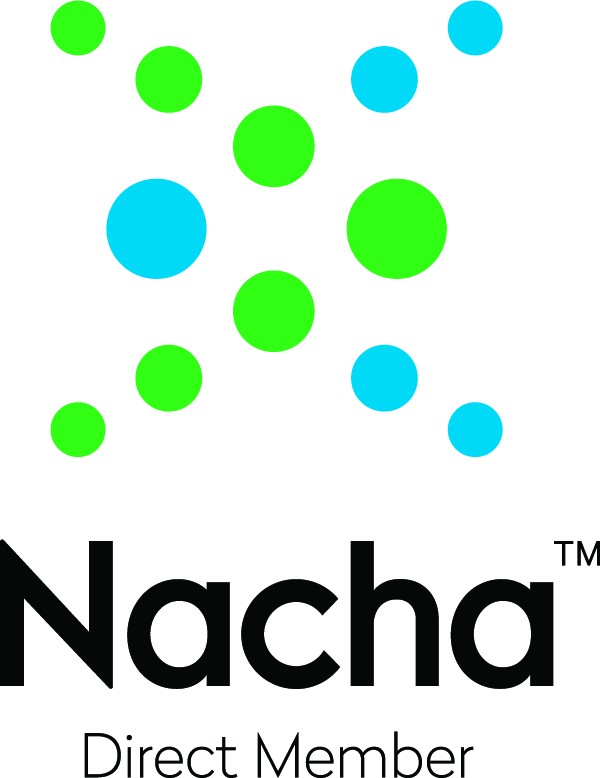
- Nacha Direct Member Logo
- Founded: 1972

Center for Payments
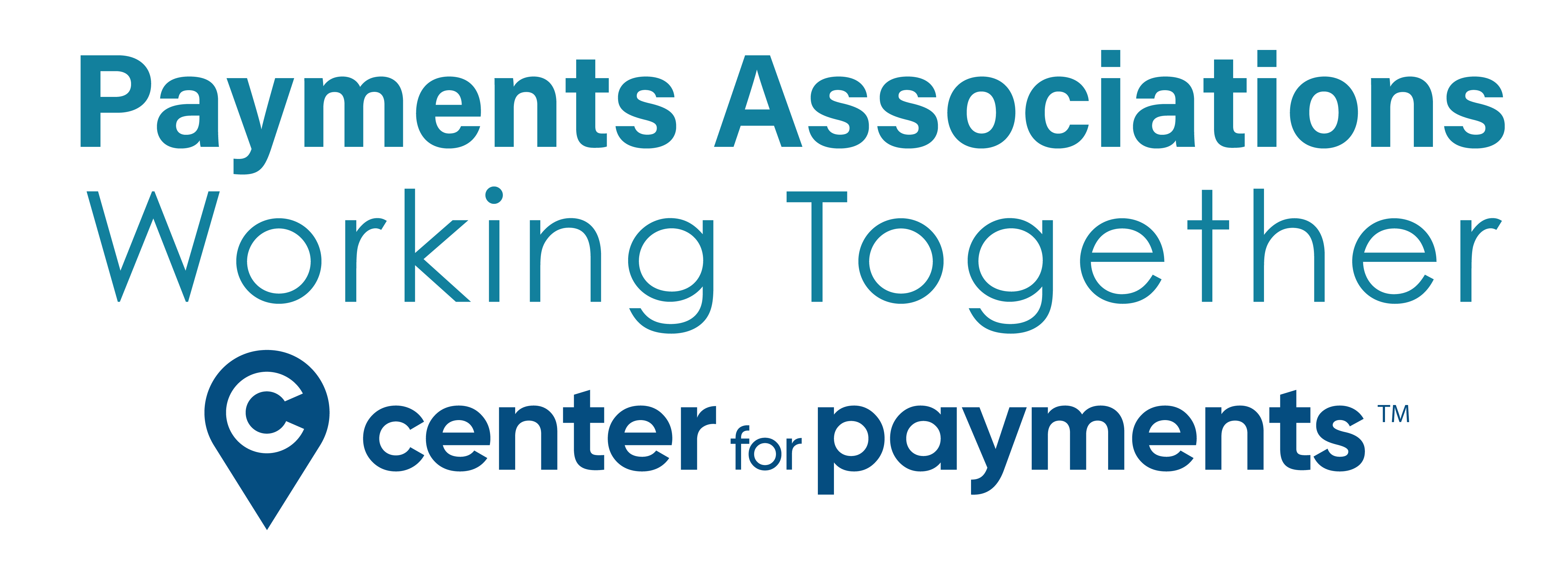
- Founded: 1972

U.S. Payments Associations are independently run, nonprofit trade organizations that provide payments-related education, industry representation, and guidance to professionals in the payments sector. Each association is a direct member of Nacha and is certified to provide ACH education.

They also collaborate with rule-makers, regulators, and other industry partners to offer guidance across various payment channels and to support the continued development of U.S. payment systems.

In addition, payments associations provide education and expertise to assist professionals in obtaining and maintaining industry accreditations and certifications, including AAP (Accredited ACH Professional), APRP (Accredited Payments Risk Professional), FPP (Faster Payments Professional), and NCP (National Check Professional).

== List of Payments Associations ==
Each Payments Association follows generally provide services to specific areas, depending on their available payments educational offerings.

Payments Association	Logo	Date Founded	Headquarters	Territory	Mergers
ePayResources		1974	Dallas, TX	Florida, Louisiana, New Mexico, North Carolina, Texas, Virginia, West Virginia	EastPay, SWACHA
EPCOR		2009	Kansas City, MO	Arkansas, Illinois, Indiana, Iowa, Kansas, Kentucky, Missouri, Nebraska, Ohio, Oklahoma, Pennsylvania, West Virginia	Mid-America Payments Exchange (MPX), Payments Central
Macha - Everything Payments - Everywhere		1975	Hanover, MD and Germantown, WI	Delaware, District of Columbia, Hawaii, Maryland, Pennsylvania, Virginia, West Virginia, Wisconsin	WACHA - Wisconsin Automated Clearinghouse Association
NEACH	NEACH logo	1973	Burlington, MA	Connecticut, Maine, Massachusetts, New Hampshire, Rhode Island, Vermont	
PaymentsFirst	Payments First logo		Atlanta, GA	Alabama, Georgia, South Carolina, Tennessee	ALACHA, GACHA, SOCACHA, TACHA
SHAZAM, Inc.	Shazam logo	1976	Johnston, IA	Iowa	
Southern Financial Exchange	Southern Financial Exchange logo	May 19, 1976	New Orleans, LA	Alabama, Arkansas, Louisiana, Mississippi, Tennessee	LAMACHA, MSACHA
The Clearing House Payments Authority	The Clearing House logo		New York, NY	Delaware, Illinois, Indiana, New Jersey, New York, Pennsylvania, Puerto Rico, U.S. Virgin Islands	The Clearing House, The Payments Authority
UMACHA	UMACHA logo	1974	Brooklyn Park, MN	Michigan, Minnesota, Montana, North Dakota, South Dakota, Wisconsin	
WesPay	WesPay logo	1972	San Francisco, CA	Alaska, American Samoa, Arizona, California, Colorado, Guam, Idaho, Nevada, New Mexico, Oregon, Utah, Washington, Wyoming	
